Ramón Silfa (born 11 November 1939) is a Dominican Republic weightlifter. He competed in the men's featherweight event at the 1968 Summer Olympics.

References

1939 births
Living people
Dominican Republic male weightlifters
Olympic weightlifters of the Dominican Republic
Weightlifters at the 1968 Summer Olympics
Sportspeople from Santo Domingo
20th-century Dominican Republic people